The Crimson Charm (Chinese: 血符門) is a 1971 Hong Kong wuxia film directed by Huang Feng and produced by the Shaw Brothers Studio.

Cast
Ivy Ling Po as Yu Fang-fang
Shih Szu as Chiang Shang-ching
Chang Yi as Han Yu
Ku Feng as Crimson chief Lin Han-su
Wang Hsieh as Yellow-gowned Chief Tsao Kang
Fang Mien as Chief Chiang Tzu-chao
James Nam as Blood Master Ling Wu-lui
Wong Ching-ho as Godly Sword
James Tien as Red-gowned Chief Au-yang Kwun
Lee Ka-ting as Leader Wang Yi
Chow Siu-loi as White-gowned Chief Fei Tung-yang
Little Unicorn as Black-gowned Chief
Hung Lau as White Face King of Hades Kwok Siu-wai
Wong Wai as Leader Yan
Liu Kei as Chiang Hsiao
Ling Siu as Man Yan-ho
Raymond Lui as Tsao Kang's son
Ng Ming-choi as Crimson Charm messenger / thug
Yeung Chak-lam as Crimson Charm messenger / thug
Chin Yuet-sang as Crimson Charm messenger / thug
Sammo Hung as Crimson Charm thug
Chin Chun as Crimson Charm thug
Lam Ching-ying as Crimson Charm thug
Wong Chi-ming as Crimson Charm thug
Cham Siu-hung as Crimson Charm thug
Leung Seung-wan as Crimson Charm thug
Siu Lo-fu as Crimson Charm thug
Yee Kwan as Innkeeper
Tsang Choh-lam as Xiao Fu, inn waiter
Luk Chuen as Chao's disciple
Wu Chi-chin as Chao's disciple
Wu Por as Chao's disciple
Sham Chin-bo as Chao's disciple
Pao Chia-wen as Chao's disciple
To Wing-leung as Chao's servant
Leung Lung as Servant of lady in mourning / thug
Man Sau as Grand Teacher
Cheung Sek-au as Passerby / Inn customer

External links

The Crimson Charm on Hong Kong Cinemagic

1971 films
Hong Kong martial arts films
Shaw Brothers Studio films
Wuxia films
1971 action films
1970s Hong Kong films